Jwar Bhata is a 1944 black and white Indian drama film directed by Amiya Chakravarty. It marked the debut of Dilip Kumar, who went on to become one of the most famous actors in Hindi films. The film also featured Mridula Rani, Shamim Bano, Agha, Vikram Kapoor, K. N. Singh, Khalil, and Mumtaz Ali. It was produced by Bombay Talkies. The music director was Anil Biswas.

Plot
An elderly man has two daughters named Rama (Shamim) and Renu (Mridula) of marriageable age. When the millionaire scion Narendra (Aga Jaan), who is slated to marry Rama, disguises himself to take a peek at his future bride, he mistakes Renu for Rama, and the two fall in love. When the mistake is discovered after the wedding, Renu curses God and is kicked out the house for heresy. She meets a wandering musician named Jagdish (Dilip Kumar), before returning home to learn that her sister is pregnant and terminally ill. They are faced with the stark choice of saving the life of the mother or the baby, until Renu makes up with God, prompting a miracle.

Cast

Dilip Kumar as Jagdish
Shamim Bano as Rama
Mridula Rani as Renu
Aga Jaan as Narendra

Soundtrack

References

External links

1944 films
Films set in Mumbai
1940s Hindi-language films
Films directed by Amiya Chakravarty
Indian romantic drama films
1944 romantic drama films
Indian black-and-white films